The discography of American country music singer Eddy Raven consists of 14 studio albums and 52 singles. Although Raven first charted in 1974, he did not reach Top 10 on the Hot Country Songs charts until "She's Playing Hard to Forget" in 1982. Between then and 1990, Raven had six songs reach No. 1 on that chart, and twelve more that reached top 10.

Studio albums

1970s and 1980s

1990s and 2000s

Compilation albums

Live albums

Singles

1960s – 1970s

1980s – 2000s

Other singles

Guest singles

Music videos

References

Country music discographies
 
Discographies of American artists